The 1976 National Soccer League season was the fifty-third season under the National Soccer League (NSL) name. The season began in late April and concluded in early October with Toronto Panhellenic securing the double (NSL Championship, and NSL Cup) by defeating Toronto First Portuguese in a two-match series for the NSL Championship. In the NSL Cup final, Panhellenic defeated Toronto Italia, while Italia successfully defended the First Division title by finishing first in the standings. In the Second Division, Hamilton Italo-Canadians defeated Toronto Croatia for both the division title and NSL II Championship.  

Toronto Italia and Serbian White Eagles were both scheduled to participate in the 1976 CONCACAF Champions' Cup, and the NSL was sanctioned by the Canadian Soccer Association (CSA) for the season. The NSL was operative in Northern Ontario, Quebec, and expanded into the United States with a franchise in Buffalo, New York.

Overview 
The National Soccer League (NSL) expanded its boundaries beyond the Canadian border with a franchise based in Buffalo, New York known as the Buffalo Blazers. The NSL made further territorial gains with a return to Northern Ontario with the acceptance of the Sudbury Cyclones. The previous time the NSL was active in the northern region was in the 1971 season. Both Buffalo, and Sudbury were placed in the Second Division. 

Though the league expanded beyond the Montreal–Windsor Corridor the membership still decreased from 21 teams to 18. The slight decrease was a result of both Srbija Kitchener, and Toronto Melita taking a leave of absence when both clubs were suspended by the Ontario Soccer Association (OSA) for making payments to amateur players. The two other departing clubs were the Ontario Selects, and Toronto Ukraina took a two-year sabbatical and returned for the 1978 season. Further changes included the relocations of Oakville United to Toronto, and the addition of another team in the Niagara region as Hamilton City became known as Welland Lions Croatia. Another notable change occurred with the renaming of Toronto Homer to Toronto Panhellenic.  

Several changes were implemented to the league's structure with the approval of a new constitution which transferred more voting power from the league's executive committee to the league ownership. Reports were also circulating of the creation of a league commissioner to replace Joe Piccininni as league president, but Piccininni resumed his duties throughout the season. The regular-season schedule was revised to prevent interlocking play between the First and Second Division teams, but both divisions were permitted to play one another in the NSL Cup. Restrictions were also placed on the allowance of five import players to each team.

Teams

Coaching changes

Standings

First Division

Second Division

Playoffs

Finals

Cup  
The cup tournament was a separate contest from the rest of the season, in which all eighteen teams took part. The tournament would conclude in a final match for the Cup.

Finals

Promotion and relegation matches 
The promotion and relegation system utilized by the National Soccer League operated with the last-placed team in the First Division being automatically relegated, while the Second Division champion would receive an automatic promotion to the First Division. The second last team in the First Division would play in a series of matches against the runner-ups in the Second Division to determine which team would be relegated or promoted.

Matches

References

External links
RSSSF CNSL page
thecnsl.com - 1976 season

1976–77 domestic association football leagues
National Soccer League
1976